Haji Farah Omar was a famous politician and Somali nationalist in the former British Somaliland Protectorate (today Somaliland). He was one of the first modern politicians to emerge in the Protectorate and later became one of the first initiators and pioneer leaders of the political struggle between Somali people and colonial forces. He is credited for the formation of the first Somali association, the Somali Islamic Association, created in 1925 for publicising Somalis' claim to independence.

Haji Farah Omar is described in the Oxford Encyclopedia of the Modern Islamic World as a reformist, modernist Islamic leader. Omar was exiled to Aden by the British administration for his protests against excesses of colonial administration, and campaigning for the improvement of economic facilities and expansion of education in the Protectorate.

Omar visited India in 1930, where he met Mahatma Gandhi and was influenced by Gandhi's non-violent philosophy which he adopted in his campaign in British Somaliland Protectorate.

Biography 
Haji Farah Omar Ileye was born in 1879 in Xagal, a town near Berbera in the Sahil region of Somaliland and is from the Reer Daahir sub-division of the Habr Je'lo Isaaq clan. Farah was from a wealthy and well respected family of pastolarists. This enabled a very young Farah, to get an education and study in a madrasah in the town. While studying the Qur'an, Farah's father Omar Ileye took him to Berbera, where he continued to study the Qur'an, as well as Arabic. Afterwards he moved to Aden for further studies and returned to Somaliland in 1904 aged 25, where he got married and had a son, Jama Haji Farah who died young while Farah was still alive.

Upon completing higher education in Aden and returning to Somaliland, he was appointed by the British authorities to be the commander of the Somaliland Camel Corps based in the eastern parts of the protectorate, which was the first time he had held public office. His time and experience as a commander shaped his views and ideology and would be the cause behind him becoming a modern anti-colonialist figure and one of the first initiators and pioneer leaders fighting the violation of the rights of the Somali people due to colonialism. A British commander had asked him what was enough for the Somali man in terms of salary, food and rank, with Farah replying in English that a Somali man is good enough in all ways like the European man. This response came as a shock to the British commander, and led to Farah being closely monitored and closely monitored by the British authorities. Suspecting that he might launch an imminent revolt, the British authorities set up a small force made up of Somalis to monitor its activities, with the Somali troops being paid extra.

Farah was subjected to increasing pressure, conspiracies and fabrications in an attempt to convict him, including a forged document purporting to be from Farah's office clerk. The letter, bearing the seal and signature of Farah, was a letter of support for Mohammed Abdullah Hassan, who was leading the Dervish movement that was fighting the British authorities. The forget letter was handed to a Somali soldier who had planned the route and time of his departure. A roadblock was then set up in the village of Ina Af-Madoobe, where the soldier was arrested. The letter was taken to the office of the District Commissioner in Burao, who subsequently fired the by then high ranking Farah.

Farah later received a scholarship to study at the Aligarh Muslim University in Aligarh, India, where he studied law and met Mahatma Gandhi, who influenced him to his non-violent philosophy as well as Mohammed Ali Jinnah and Jawaharlal Nehru. His study of law became Farah Omar's key to paving the way for his political struggle for independence, and it became a weapon against British colonial rule in the country. Upon graduation he opened a lawyer's office and later joined the British Lawyers Association. The British authorities responded by using 35 government-paid chiefs in an attempt to turn the public against him. This was possible to some extent as public knowledge was low at the time. As a result, Farah once again left the country and returned to Aden.

Political activism 
Upon his arrival in Aden in 1920, Haji Farah along with several other key Somali figures formed the Somali Islamic Association, the first Somali nationalist association in history. Throughout its existence, it served as the defender of Somali interests throughout the Horn of Africa. The Somali Islamic Association took an active interest in development in the British Somaliland protectorate and frequently petitioned the British authorities on Somali matters. Farah, inspired by Gandhi's non-violent activism, himself pursued a similar form of peaceful activism.

In 1938 he was appointed the representative of the Kenyan Isaaq and their interests in the British Somaliland protectorate. According to Touval, "one of the first modern politicians to emerge in the Protectorate". The same year he returned to Somaliland to organize opposition to British efforts to create a written Somali language, fearing that the Isaaqs in Kenya would lose their privileged status as Asiatics. It was also suggested that the attempt to introduce a written language for Somali was motivated by the British authorities' desire to spread Christianity. In the beginning of August 1938 he was appointed the spokesman of the local Somalis in Burao. A document, signed by 125 local akils and elders, declared:

By the end of August Farah was gaining considerable support in Hargeisa, where he was eventually elected as its spokesman with the backing of the local branch of the Qadiriyyah tariqa. By then the British authorities felt that Farah was posing a significant threat to the entire Government of the Protectorate. Later Farah got himself elected as spokesman of Berbera. With the pressure of Haji Farah, and with the almost universal opposition to a written Somali language, the Governor of British Somaliland at the time Vincent Glenday had no choice but to hold the Protectorate's educational policy in abeyance.

Exile and imprisonment 
Haji Farah's political agitation and activism did not find favour with the British colonial authorities and was seen as a dangerous threat, which led to him being arrested and exiled to the Socotra islands off the coast of Somalia in modern-day Yemen.  Following the news of Haji Farah's arrest and deportation, his associations, particularly the Somali Islamic Association and the British Lawyers Association both protested. The famous Habr Yunis poet Haji Adan Ahmed Af-Qallooc describes the conditions under which Farah was imprisoned in his poem Raqdii Bashiir (The Corpse of Bashir), written in July 1944. In the poem, he said:

When the British government realized and confirmed that he was weak and powerless, and that in addition to old age had many illnesses that he could no longer handle, Haji Farah was eventually released him from prison at the end of World War II. The elderly Farah, who had returned from a long period of illness and hardship from isolation and hardship, arrived in Hargeisa. The British authorities, again fearing that his presence alone was dangerous and could lead to yet even more unrest, exiled him to Harar to be kept separate from the public. After five to six months of living in Harar he returned to Hargeisa.

Death 
Haji Farah died in 1948 at the age of 70, and had by then spent most of his life in conflict, war, struggle, long journeys, imprisonment and persecution. Farah, who was being mourned by his friends and other supporters when he passed away, said to his friend Haji Ashaado before passing away:

References 

Ethnic Somali people
1871 births
1949 deaths
Somali nationalists
Somalian religious leaders
Somalian activists
Somalian Muslims